Yuri Senesi (born 26 January 1997) is an Italian football player. He plays as a forward for Serie D club Lupa Frascati.

Club career

Cynthia 
On 13 September 2015, Senesi made his Serie D debut, for Cynthia, as a substitute replacing Doriano Facondini in the 46th minute of a 0–0 home draw against Budoni, 3 days later he played his first entire match for Cynthia, a 2–1 away defeat against Torres. On 29 November he scored twice in a 3–0 away win over Astrea. Senesi ended his season with 34 appearances, 2 goals and 1 assist.

Olbia 
On 4 August 2016, Senesi was signed by Serie C side Olbia on an undisclosed fee. On 27 August he made his professional debut in Serie C, for Olbia, as a substitute replacing Mattia Muroni in the 79th minute of a 2–1 away defeat against Renate. On 18 September, Senesi played his first match as a starter for Olbia, a 1–0 away defeat against Lupa Roma, he was replaced by Daniele Ragatzu in the 66th minute. On 24 September 2017 he scored his first professional goal, as a substitute, in the 85th minute of a 2–0 home win over Pontedera. On 7 April 2018 he scored twice in a 4–2 home win over Livorno.

Venezia
On 10 July 2019, he signed a 2-year contract with two additional one-year options with Venezia.

On 5 October 2020 he joined Serie C club Cavese on loan.

Serie C
On 5 August 2021, he signed with Vibonese in Serie C. On 13 January 2022, he moved to Picerno.

Career statistics

Club

References

External links 
 

1997 births
People from Genzano di Roma
Sportspeople from the Metropolitan City of Rome Capital
Footballers from Lazio
Living people
Italian footballers
Association football forwards
Olbia Calcio 1905 players
Venezia F.C. players
Cavese 1919 players
U.S. Vibonese Calcio players
AZ Picerno players
Serie B players
Serie C players
Serie D players